Pachystola is a genus of longhorn beetles of the subfamily Lamiinae, containing the following species:

 Pachystola erinacea Jordan, 1894
 Pachystola fuliginosa Chevrolat, 1858 
 Pachystola granulipennis Breuning, 1971
 Pachystola mamillata (Dalman, 1817)

References

Pachystolini